Thongsook College is a private higher education institute located in 
Boromratchonni Road, Thawi Watthana District, Bangkok, Thailand. Established in 1994, the college offers several undergraduate programs and a Thai master's degree program in business administration. They also provide a student managed Teaching English to Speakers of Other Languages (BA TESOL) program.

Thai Language Programs

Undergraduate

Graduate

English Language Programs

Undergraduate

Notable alumni
Parkpoom Jangphonak 1998 Asian Games gold medalist boxer
Worapoj Petchkoom 2004 Summer Olympics silver medalist boxer
Sudaporn Seesondee 2020 Summer Olympics bronze medalist female boxer

See also
 List of universities in Thailand
 Education in Thailand
 International Standard Classification of Education

References

External links 
 Official website

Universities and colleges in Bangkok
Educational institutions established in 1994
1994 establishments in Thailand
Colleges in Thailand